Aansoo  is a Pakistani drama television series aired on Pakistan Television network in 2000. The drama was written by the legendary writer Haseena Moin and directed by Ali Rizvi. The drama became immensely popular because of its interesting and romantic story line and because of its beautiful locations. The drama was shot in Pakistan, Scotland and Ireland. It was the first Pakistani serial to be filmed entirely on a digital camera. The drama serial is considered to be a classic and has aired several times on PTV since its initial release.
The title song of the serial 'Tanha Tanha' sung by Ali Azmat, composed by Waqar Ali and written by Sabir Zafar became a rage during its release and is still very popular.

Plot
Aansoo is a story of two families as they recover from tragedies that have torn them apart. Two best friends realize that they are in fact brothers living each other's lives. On the other hand, cultural differences leave two sisters living on opposite sides of the world with no knowledge of each other's existence.

Synopsis
Sami Khan [Noman Aijaz] is a Pakistani guy who falls in love with a British born girl Sofie. Sofie marries Sami Khan and moves to Pakistan. In the beginning, everything goes fine but when Sofie gives birth to a baby girl that brings the tension because Sami wanted a baby boy. They have two daughters, Imaan Tasmina Sheikh and younger daughter Isha [Maheen]. They quarrel quite often and Sofie can't adjust herself in different culture and surroundings anymore and she moves back to Scotland. Imaan stays with her father and Sofie takes Isha along. Sami Khan has a sister Aaliya. She is married and has a son Saram [Asad] and they live in Scotland.

Dr. Ahsan [Talat Hussain] gets marry to a Pakistani woman Sadia [Shagufta Ejaz] because his mother forces him to marry her. They have a son Aryan [Zulfikar Sheikh]. Dr. Ahsan moves to Scotland and leaves Sadia and Aryan alone in Pakistan. He marries another woman Amna [Sakina Shamoon] but they don't have a child. Dr. Ahsan returns to Pakistan after two years and takes his son from Sadia and divorces her.

Sadia wants her son back and decides to fight for her rights. She moves to Scotland in search of her son. Then Amna come to know that she is expecting a child and she gives birth to a baby boy Danial [Nabeel]. One day Sadia finds out about Dr. Ahsan and talks to his 2nd wife and gets a nanny's job in his house and takes away Amna's son very first day to take revenge.

After 22 years, Aryan and Denial turn out to be friends. Aryan becomes a doctor just like his father and Denial studies for MBA and they fall in love with the same girl – Isha.
Saram is an easy going guy and loves music. He plays guitar and keyboard and he falls in love with Imaan. Imaan loses her self-confidence and becomes very confused and disturb. She feels very lonely, sad and thinks that her mother doesn't love her. Meanwhile, Isha grows up as an independent girl, gets her mother's love and studies Law, whereas, Dr. Ahsan loses his memory and his sanity.

Cast 
 Talat Hussain as Dr. Ahsan
 Noman Ijaz as Sami Khan
 Asad Malik as Saram
 Nabeel as Danial
 Maheen Ishaq as Isha
 Shagufta Ejaz as Sadia
 Sakina Samo as Amna
 Fareeda Shabbir as Tai
 Tasmina Sheikh as Iman
 Akram  Mohammadi as Mamoon
 Zulfikar Sheikh as Aryan
 Ghazala Javed as Chachi
 Huma Tahir as Aliya
 Rashida Yaqoob as Bua
 Sania Hussain as Sofia
 Hugh Sullivan
 Shakeel as Doctor (cameo)

Production crew
 Haseena Moin (writer)
 Zulfiqar Sheikh (producer)
 Ali Rizvi (director)

References

External links
 https://www.youtube.com/watch?v=e-JiQE0EKVQ, Watch Pakistan Television drama 'Aansoo' (2000) on YouTube, Retrieved 26 Dec 2016

Pakistani drama television series
Urdu-language television shows
Pakistan Television Corporation original programming
Pakistani television series endings